Šentvid may refer to:

In Austria:
 Sankt Veit an der Glan, known as Šentvid ob Glini in Slovene

In Italy:
 San Vito al Torre, known as Šentvid na Teru in Slovene

In Slovenia:
 Podnanos, a settlement in the Municipality of Vipava, known as Šentvid before 1952
 Šentvid District, a district of the city of Ljubljana
 Šentvid, Ljubljana, a former settlement in the city of Ljubljana
 Šentvid pri Grobelnem, a settlement in the Municipality of Šmarje pri Jelšah
 Šentvid pri Lukovici, a settlement in the Municipality of Lukovica
 Šentvid pri Planini, a settlement in the Municipality of Šentjur
 Šentvid pri Stični, a settlement in the Municipality of Ivančna Gorica
 Šentvid pri Zavodnju, a settlement the Municipality of Šoštanj